Jonathan Arnold (December 3, 1741 – February 1, 1793) was an American physician and statesman from New England. He was born in Gloucester, Rhode Island, served in the Continental Army as a surgeon, and directed the army hospital in Providence. He represented Rhode Island as a delegate to the Confederation Congress in 1782 and 1783. He moved to a farm in St. Johnsbury, Vermont in 1787, and later served as a judge.

Early life
Jonathan Arnold was born in Gloucester, Rhode Island on December 3, 1741 (Old Style December 14), the son of Josiah Arnold and Amy (Phillips) Arnold. He trained for a career in medicine and practiced as a physician in Providence. In 1774, he became a charter member of the Providence Grenadiers militia unit, and until 1776 he commanded a company with the rank of captain. In 1776, Arnold was elected to the Rhode Island General Assembly, where he authored the May Act that repealed the requirement for government officials and militia officers to swear an oath of allegiance to England.

At the start of the American Revolution, Arnold joined the Continental Army as a surgeon. During the war, he was head of the military hospital in Providence. He was elected as a Delegate to the Congress of the Confederation in 1782, and served until 1783. While he was a member of Congress, the body voted in secret to arrest Luke Knowlton and Samuel Wells of Brattleboro in the Vermont Republic on suspicion of communicating with the British in Canada. They fled before they could be detained, but returned to Brattleboro after the end of the Revolution. Arnold was accused of warning Knowlton and Wells prior to their arrests, which he denied, but fellow members of Congress including James Madison did not believe his denial.

Later life

In 1786, Arnold moved to Winchester, New Hampshire, where he continued to practice medicine. He subsequently became proprietor and the first settler of St. Johnsbury, Vermont, and served as St. Johnsbury's first town clerk. While living in Vermont, Arnold also obtained charters for the towns of Bestbury (now Lyndon), Burke, and Billymead (now Sutton).

After settling in Vermont, Arnold served on the governor's council from 1790 to 1793. He was a judge of the Orange County court beginning in 1792, and he remained on the bench until his death. While living in Rhode Island, Arnold's family had been given a slave, Ruth Farrow, as a gift. Arnold was a member of the Providence Society for Promoting the Abolition of Slavery, and freed Farrow, who continued to live with and work for members of the Arnold family until her death in 1841.

Death and burial
Arnold died in St. Johnsbury on February 1, 1793. He was initially buried in the Arnold family plot in the town cemetery. When the cemetery's land was appropriated for a courthouse in 1856, Arnold was reburied at Mount Pleasant Cemetery in St. Johnsbury. Arnold Park in St. Johnsbury is located near the site of Arnold's former home, and is named for him.

Family
In 1763, Arnold married Marry Burr (1743–1781). His second wife was Alice Crawford (1757–1790), whom he married in 1782. After the death of his second wife, in 1792 Arnold married Cynthia Hastings Ladd (1763–1838).

Arnold was the father of 11 children:

Amy Arnold Deuel (1764–1843)
Amaziah Arnold (1766–1767)
Josias Lyndon Arnold (1768–1796)
Polly Burr Arnold (1770–1772)
William C. Arnold (1773–1813)
Sarah (Sally) Arnold Burrill (1777–1814)
Abigail Arnold Dow (1780–1824)
John Crawford Arnold (1784–1784)
Freelove Crawford Arnold (1788–1789)
Freelove Crawford Arnold Davis (1790–1848)
Lemuel Hastings Arnold (1792–1852)

Arnold's son Lemuel Hastings Arnold served in the United States House of Representatives and as Governor of Rhode Island. His grandson Noah Davis served in the United States House of Representatives. His grandson Richard Arnold was a career officer in the United States Army who served as a brigadier general of volunteers in the Union Army during the American Civil War and attained the rank of major general of both volunteers and the regular army by brevet. His great-great-grandson Theodore Francis Green served as Rhode Island's governor and as a United States Senator.

Notes

References

External links

1741 births
1793 deaths
Politicians from Providence, Rhode Island
Vermont state court judges
Continental Congressmen from Rhode Island
18th-century American politicians
Continental Army officers from Rhode Island
Physicians in the American Revolution
People of colonial Rhode Island